Vulturu (historical name: Cartal) is a commune in Constanța County, Northern Dobruja, Romania, including the village with the same name.

Demographics
At the 2011 census, Vulturu had 610 Romanians (100.00%).

References

Communes in Constanța County
Localities in Northern Dobruja